After Burner III is a video game released for the FM-Towns home computer in Japan and later ported to the Sega CD in Japan, Europe and North America. It is the third game in the After Burner series, and a port of Strike Fighter, a game released for Japanese arcades, itself a sequel to G-LOC: Air Battle.

The basic controls are the same as previous games in the series but this time the player has access to unlimited missiles.

Reception

Mega Action gave a review score of 48% praising the arcade style graphics and sound, the game intro and the option to change the gameplay camera. They criticized the gameplay lacking plot, detail and playability.

References

External links

 After Burner III  at UVL

1992 video games
Arcade video games
Flight simulation video games
FM Towns games
Sega CD games
Sega video games
Video games designed by Yu Suzuki
Single-player video games
Video games developed in Japan
CRI Middleware games